Ashfaque Ahmad Mangi (born 16 August 1971) is a Pakistani politician who was the senior vice chairman of Pak Sarzameen Party (PSP).

Political career

Provincial Assembly of Sindh 
In 2013, Ashfaq contested the elections for Sindh Provincial Assembly with Constituency PS-127. He received 59811 votes and won his seat in the Sindh Provincial Assembly.

Joining Pak Sarzameen Party 
He In 2016, he joined Pak Sarzameen Party and resigned from his provincial assembly seat. In September 2020, Ashfaq was elected as the senior vice chairman of Pak Sarzameen Party.

Early life and education 
Ashfaq was born on 16 August 1971 in Khairpur, Sindh. He did his masters in economics from Shah Abdul Latif University. His father is Atta Muhammad Mangi.

References 

1971 births
Living people
Shah Abdul Latif University alumni
People from Khairpur District
Pak Sarzameen Party members